The 2023 Four Continents Short Track Speed Skating Championships is the second Four Continents Short Track Speed Skating Championships and to be held from 10 to 12 November 2022 in Salt Lake City, United States. Skaters from 13 countries participated in the competition.

Medal summary

Men's events

Women's events

Mixed event

Medal table

References

External links
Results book

Four Continents
Four Continents Short Track Speed Skating Championships
International speed skating competitions hosted by the United States
Sports competitions in Salt Lake City
Four Continents Short Track Speed Skating Championships